Šimonys is a small town in Panevėžys County, in northeastern Lithuania. According to the 2011 census, the town has a population of 441 people.

References

External links
 Virtual Tour of Šimonys

Towns in Lithuania
Towns in Panevėžys County
Trakai Voivodeship
Vilkomirsky Uyezd
Kupiškis District Municipality